The Venturi Fétish was an early-2000s two-seat limited-production electric sports car. It was built by Venturi in Monaco, and the design of the car was done by the Parisian designers Sacha Lakic. It holds the title of being the first electric sports car in history.  It was first unveiled in 2002 and was sold for the first time in November 2004 in the Japanese market. Only 25 units have been produced. Production of the car was stopped in 2007, with a new version being launched in 2010.

Overview 

Before its electric version, a petrol version of the same vehicle (fitted with a Renault petrol engine) was introduced in concept form at the 2002 Geneva Motor Show, and was also shown at the 2002 Paris Motor Show and the 2003 North American International Auto Show. First sold in the year 2004, a new version of the car was launched in 2010. It is not a mass-produced vehicle. Only 25 units have been produced. The production of this electric sports car was stopped in the year 2007.

Technical specifications
The original electric Fétish used a  electric motor in place of the internal combustion engine fitted to most sports cars.

See also
 List of production battery electric vehicles
 Lightning GT
 Tesla Roadster (2008)
 Wrightspeed X1

References

External links

 Official website

Electric sports cars
Production electric cars
Rear mid-engine, rear-wheel-drive vehicles
Venturi vehicles
Cars introduced in 2006